Eileen M. A. Harkin-Jones  is the Bombardier Aerospace-Royal Academy of Engineering professor of composites engineering at the Ulster University.

Education 
Harkin-Jones studied mechanical engineering at University College Dublin, and received first class honours in 1983. She completed her PhD at Queen's University Belfast working on materials for rotational moulding in 1992.

Research and career
Harkin-Jones was appointed a lecturer at Queen's in 1993. In 1999 Harkin-Jones became the first woman to be appointed an engineering professor in Ireland. Her research is on polymer processing and the development of materials. In 2015 she was appointed the Bombardier-Royal Academy of Engineering professor of composite engineering at Ulster University. At Ulster University she focuses on aerospace composites and sustainable plastic manufacture. Using injection moulding, thermoforming and additive manufacture Harkin-Jones is exploring advanced thermoplastic composite materials for medical devices and aerospace. She has published over 200 peer reviewed papers, and secured funding over £12 million.

She is a member of the Royal Academy of Engineering Higher Education committee and Deputy Chair of the Northern Ireland Higher Education Authority. She is campaigns for gender equality in science, technology, engineering, and mathematics (STEM) at a national level. She is a member of the All-Party Parliamentary Group for Manufacturing.

Awards and honours
In 2017 she was appointed a Fellow of the Irish Academy of Engineering. She was elected a Fellow of the Royal Academy of Engineering (FREng) in 2011. In 2013 she was appointed Order of the British Empire (OBE) for services to higher education.

References 

20th-century Irish engineers
21st-century Irish engineers
20th-century women engineers
21st-century women engineers
Irish women engineers
Irish mechanical engineers
Aerospace engineers
Women aerospace engineers
Fellows of the Royal Academy of Engineering
Female Fellows of the Royal Academy of Engineering
Members of the Order of the British Empire
Alumni of University College Dublin
Alumni of Queen's University Belfast
Living people
Year of birth missing (living people)